Golden Valley Unified School District is a public school district in Madera County, California, United States.

References

External links
 

School districts in Madera County, California